Anikó Milassin (born 13 April 1954) is a Hungarian athlete. She competed in the women's long jump at the 1976 Summer Olympics.

References

1954 births
Living people
Athletes (track and field) at the 1976 Summer Olympics
Hungarian female long jumpers
Olympic athletes of Hungary
Place of birth missing (living people)